The 1983 Grand Prix de Tennis de Toulouse was a men's tennis tournament played on indoor carpet in Toulouse, France that was part of the Grand Prix series of the 1983 Grand Prix tennis circuit. It was the second edition of the tournament and was held from 21 November – 27 November.

Seeds
Champion seeds are indicated in bold text while text in italics indicates the round in which those seeds were eliminated.

Draw

Finals

References

Doubles
Grand Prix de Tennis de Toulouse